Paul Constantin Codrea (born 4 April 1981 in Timișoara) is a Romanian football manager and former player. A former midfielder, he was part of the Romanian squad at UEFA Euro 2008.

Playing career

Club
Paul Codrea started playing football in his hometown at the LPS Banatul Timișoara club. He went to play for Dinamo București, making his Divizia A debut on 1 March 1997 when he came as a substitute and replaced Cătălin Hîldan in a 1–0 loss against Gloria Bistrița. After playing one more game in Divizia A for Dinamo, the club loaned him to play for Politehnica Timișoara in Divizia B. Two seasons later, he returned to play in Divizia A this time, being loaned by Dinamo at Argeș Pitești. In 2001, Codrea moved abroad, signing with Serie B club Genoa for a transfer fee of 2.75 million $. He later joined Palermo, where in the first half of the 2003–04 Serie B season he helped the team win the Serie B title, thus gaining promotion to Serie A. In January 2004 he was loaned by Palermo together with Franco Brienza at Serie A team Perugia in exchange for the transfer of Fabio Grosso. He was loaned once again by Palermo at Torino for the 2004–05 Serie B season in which he scored one goal in 35 appearances, helping the team gain promotion to Serie A, which was later revoked because of the club's financial problems. Codrea definitively leaved Palermo when he signed with Serie A club Siena in 2006, where he played until 2012, with a interruption of a half a year in 2011 when he was loaned at Bari. In July 2012, he returned to Romania and joined Rapid București and in the winter of 2013, he returned home at Politehnica Timișoara being a player-manager. Codrea has a total of 133 matches and three goals scored in Serie A, 111 matches and six goals scored in Serie B, 47 games and one goal scored in Divizia A and 6 games played for Palermo in the 2005–06 UEFA Cup.

International career
Paul Codrea played 44 games and scored one goal at international level for Romania, making his debut on 15 November 2000 under coach László Bölöni in a friendly which ended with a 2–1 victory against FR Yugoslavia. He scored his only goal for the national team on his fourth appearance in a friendly against Lithuania which ended with a 3–0 victory. He played four games at the 2002 World Cup qualifiers, five at the Euro 2004 qualifiers and two at the 2006 World Cup qualifiers. Codrea played 8 games at the successful Euro 2008 qualifiers. He was used by coach Victor Pițurcă in all three games in the group stage at the Euro 2008 final tournament, in the first one which was a 0–0 against France he came as a substitute and replaced Răzvan Cociș in the 64th minute, in the second one he played the whole game of the 1–1 against Italy and in the third game he played as a starter and was replaced in the 72nd minute by Nicolae Dică in the 2–0 loss against Netherlands. Paul Codrea went to play four games at the 2010 World Cup qualifiers and made his last appearance for the national team on 3 March 2010 in a friendly which ended with a 2–0 loss against Israel.

On 25 March 2008, Codrea was decorated by the president of Romania, Traian Băsescu, for his performance in the UEFA Euro 2008 qualifying Group G, where Romania managed to qualify to UEFA Euro 2008 Group C. He received Medalia "Meritul Sportiv" – ("The Sportive Merit" Medal) class III.

International stats

International goals

Coaching career
He signed with fifth league team ASU Politehnica Timișoara in 2013, replacing Antonio Foale who became General Manager. He debuted with a 3–0 victory over Gran-Plaz Liebling on 18 March 2013. He resigned on 29 November 2014.

Honours

Player
Palermo
Serie B: 2003–04

Notes

References

External links

1981 births
Living people
Sportspeople from Timișoara
Romanian footballers
Romania international footballers
Association football midfielders
UEFA Euro 2008 players
Liga I players
Liga II players
FC Dinamo București players
FC Politehnica Timișoara players
FC Argeș Pitești players
FC Rapid București players
SSU Politehnica Timișoara players
Serie A players
Serie B players
Genoa C.F.C. players
Palermo F.C. players
A.C. Perugia Calcio players
Torino F.C. players
A.C.N. Siena 1904 players
S.S.C. Bari players
Romanian expatriate footballers
Romanian expatriate sportspeople in Italy
Expatriate footballers in Italy
Romanian football managers
SSU Politehnica Timișoara managers
FC Ripensia Timișoara managers